McIndoe is an Irish-Scottish surname. Notable people with the surname include:

Alan McIndoe (born 1964), Australian rugby league footballer of the 1980s and 1990s
James McIndoe (1824–1905), New Zealand politician, father of John
John McIndoe (printer) (1858–1916), New Zealand printer, father of Archibald and John
Archibald McIndoe CBE FRCS (1900–1960), pioneering New Zealand plastic surgeon who worked for the Royal Air Force during World War II
John McIndoe (artist) (1898–1995), New Zealand artist and printer
James Francis McIndoe (1868–1919), United States Brigadier general
John McIndoe (minister) (born 1934), minister of the Church of Scotland
Michael McIndoe (born 1979), Scottish professional footballer who currently plays for Coventry City
Walter D. McIndoe (1819–1872), U.S. Representative from Wisconsin
Wayne McIndoe (born 1972), field hockey player

See also
:Category:Hill-McIndoe-Gillies family, Scottish-New Zealand-Australian family